Jhon Jarrín (21 December 1961 – 9 March 2021) was an Ecuadorian track cyclist.

He was seen as a Colombian track cycling pioneer. After he became an established track cyclist, he competed in the individual and team pursuit events at the 1980 Summer Olympics.

He became the South American, Bolivarian Games and Pan American champion. He continued with track cycling in the masters category. He was together with footballer Arturo Cárdenas the torch lighter at the 1985 Bolivarian Games.

Jarrín was hit by a car in Cuenca on 9 March 2021 and died from the injuries shortly after.

References

External links

1961 births
2021 deaths
Ecuadorian male cyclists
Olympic cyclists of Ecuador
Cyclists at the 1980 Summer Olympics
People from Chimborazo Province
Road incident deaths in Ecuador
Pedestrian road incident deaths